Niyar Saikia (born 9 November 1999) is an Indian actress. She played Lakshmi in Jeffrey D. Brown's film Sold.

Early life 
Saikia was born in Guwahati, Assam, as the daughter of musicians Probin Saikia and Roshmi Rekha Saikia. She is a student of folk dances and songs of Assam at the Panchasur Institute and at the Seagull theatre. Saikia is training under Padmashree Awardee and Nrityacharya, Shri Jatin Goswami for Sattriya.

Career 
Saikia started acting at age 5. Her first (unreleased) film was Butterfly Chase, directed by Jahnu Baruah. Niyar started performing in theatre and soaps and received a Best Actress award in the All India Multi-Lingual Children Play ad Dance competition-Cuttack (Orissa), portraying a girl named Dhunumoina. Saikia acted in Assamese and Hindi films before she was cast in Sold in 2014. The film is directed by Oscar-winning director Jeffrey D. Brown and based on Patricia McCormick's novel Sold. She was selected for the role after casting director Tess Joseph auditioned more than a thousand girls in Nepal and India. Saikia played the role of a trafficked Nepalese child, Lakshmi, who is sold off to a brothel in Kolkata.

Filmography 
Sold, as Lakshmi
Aai Kot Nai
Main Ganga
Butterfly Chase
Ami Axomiya
Joymoti

References

External links 
 

Living people
Actresses from Guwahati
1999 births
Indian child actresses
21st-century Indian actresses
Indian female dancers
Dancers from Assam